Trysil-Knut is a Norwegian film from 1942. Rasmus Breistein directed this skiing melodrama during the German occupation of Norway. It tells the story of the legendary skier Knut from Trysil, an ardent patriot at the beginning of the 1800s who uses his skiing skills to prevent war from breaking out between Norway and Sweden. Knut also wins back a property that he was cheated out of and his "princess."

Like many of the films from the interwar period or the occupation years, this is an adventure story. Breistein's point of departure for the story was a popular novel by Rudolf Muus from 1914, and he was also inspired by Bernt Lund's poem from 1861 and by 's story from 1909.

Cast

References

External links 
 
 Norsk filmografi: Trysil-Knut

1942 films
Norwegian black-and-white films
Films directed by Rasmus Breistein
Norwegian romantic drama films
1942 romantic drama films
Melodrama films
1940s Norwegian-language films